Naor Sabag (born 23 May 1993) is an Israeli footballer who plays as a midfielder for F.C. Ashdod.

Career
On May 29, 2019, Sabag signed Hapoel Be'er Sheva for three years. On July 11, Sabag made his debut in the 1–1 draw against Laçi as part of the 2019–20 UEFA Europa League. a week later in the interplay, he made his score the goal and helped his team qualify to the Second qualifying round. On November 3, Sabag scored his first goal in the Israeli Premier League in a 2–0 win over Maccabi Netanya at Turner Stadium. On July 13, 2020, Sabag won the Israel State Cup after a 2–0 victory against Maccabi Petah Tikva. In 2020, he was transferred from Hapoel Be'er Sheva to Maccabi Petah Tikva.

Career statistics

Honours

Club

 Hapoel Be'er Sheva
Israel State Cup: 2019–20

References

External links

Naor Sabag at Uefa

1993 births
Living people
Israeli Jews
Israeli footballers
Hakoah Maccabi Amidar Ramat Gan F.C. players
Hapoel Katamon Jerusalem F.C. players
Hapoel Bik'at HaYarden F.C. players
Sektzia Ness Ziona F.C. players
Hapoel Be'er Sheva F.C. players
Maccabi Petah Tikva F.C. players
F.C. Ashdod players
Liga Leumit players
Israeli Premier League players
Footballers from Beersheba
Israeli people of Moroccan-Jewish descent
Association football wingers
Association football midfielders